This page lists the winners and nominees for the Soul Train Music Soul Train Certified Award, formerly the Centric Award. The award has been given out since the 2009 ceremony.

Winners and nominees
Winners are listed first and highlighted in bold.

2000s

2010s

2020s

References

Soul Train Music Awards